Dryanovo is a Bulgarian town situated at the northern foot of the Balkan Mountains in Gabrovo Province; amphitheatrically along the two banks of Dryanovo River, a tributary to the Yantra River. The town is a centre of the homonymous Dryanovo Municipality, which is composed of 62 villages, hamlets and huts picturesquely spread out of the mountain folds. As of 2015, it has a population of 7,968. In 2009, it was 8,043.

Geography

Dryanovo has a favourable geographical position, being situated 20 km away from Gabrovo, 24 km from Veliko Tarnovo, 17 km from Tryavna and about 30 km away from Sevlievo. The town lies on the Rousse-Veliko Tarnovo-Gabrovo-Shipka-Kazanlak-Stara Zagora highway and it is a station of the main railway thoroughfare, which links the north and the south part of Bulgaria.

History
Like all Balkan mountain settlements, Dryanovo reached its bloom at the time of the Bulgarian National Revival. In 1883 it was proclaimed a town. Masons and woodcarvers spread the fame of the town throughout Bulgaria and far away in the Ottoman Empire.

The oldest traces of life on Balkan Peninsula were discovered in the area, proofs of human presence from the Paleolithic were discovered in Bacho Kiro cave near Dryanovo monastery, situated in the Andaka river valley. Numerous relics of ancient villages, fortresses, pillars with inscriptions and ornaments from Thracian and Roman times (Boruna and Diskoduratera fortresses) were discovered there.

Dryanovo is sometimes referred to as "a town of centenarians" for the healthy climatic conditions prolonging people's life. The town is also known as the birthplace of the renowned architect Kolyu Ficheto.

Museums

 The Kolyu Ficheto Museum - the museum is located in the Eastern part of town, on Kolyu Ficheto square. Right next to its entrance, there is a large bronze statue made by Bulgarian artist Boris Gondov, which is dedicated to architect Kolyu Ficheto, or The Master as he was also popular. The museum hosts a permanent exposition named "Kolyu Ficheto - life and art", comprised by different documents and artifacts related to The Master: building plans, pictures from old archives and new ones, tools from the period when he was active, as well as some personal belongings among others.
 In the Dryanovo History Museum you can enjoy several expositions such as "Urban manners from the end of 19th and the beginning 20th century", which can be seen in the Lafchieva and Perevi historic buildings; "Icons and church carpentry from the Dryanovo region, from 17th to 19th century", located in the town's official art gallery; and "Archaeology and the National Revival", exposed in the Dryanovo monastery.

Honours
Dryanovo Heights on Greenwich Island in the South Shetland Islands, Antarctica is named after Dryanovo.

International relations

Twin towns — Sister cities
Dryanovo is twinned with:

  Bykhaw, Belarus 
  Itamos, Greece
  Kavarna, Bulgaria  
  Borgia, Italy  
  Rocca Imperiale, Italy  
  Bocholt, Belgium
  Radoviš, North Macedonia
 Ma'ale Adumim, Israeli settlement in the West Bank

See also
 Dryanovo monastery
 Sokolsky monastery
 City of Gabrovo
 Gabrovo jokes
 Etar Architectural-Ethnographic Complex
 Village of Bozhentsi
 Winter Resort Uzana
 FC Lokomotiv Dryanovo

References
 Guide-Bulgaria.com

External links

 Tourist information and accommodation
 Dryanovo tourism website
 Dryanovo municipality website
 Dryanovo informative publication
 Tourist information about Bulgaria
 Dryanovo on youtube

Towns in Bulgaria
Populated places in Gabrovo Province